Matt "Lucky" Yates (born October 18, 1967) is an American actor, voice actor, puppeteer and comedian. He is known for his voice roles as Dr. Krieger on Archer and the Xtacles on Frisky Dingo. He was also a recurring actor on the Food Network series Good Eats. He studied theater at Wayne State University and regularly performs at Dad's Garage in Atlanta, Georgia.

From 2000 to 2007, he hosted The Lucky Yates Talk Show, a live on-stage weekly talk show in Atlanta, Georgia.

In 2016, Yates was hired as a host for the film streaming service from Turner Classic Movies and The Criterion Collection, FilmStruck.

in 2021, Yates coauthored a comic called "Lester Of The Lesser Gods" with artist Eric Powell.

Filmography

Film

Television

Internet

References

External links

1967 births
21st-century American male actors
American male comedians
American male voice actors
Living people
Place of birth missing (living people)
Male actors from Detroit
Wayne State University alumni
21st-century American comedians